is a Japanese professional footballer who plays as a winger for J1 League club Vissel Kobe.

Career

Montedio Yamagata
Yuruki made his official debut for Montedio Yamagata in the J. League Division 2, on 2 March 2014 against Shonan Bellmare in Shonan BMW Stadium Hiratsuka in Hiratsuka, Japan. He subbed in the match for Hiroki Bandai in the 74th minute. Hidaka and his club lost the match 1-0.

Vissel Kobe
In December 2021, it was announced that Yuruki would be joining Vissel Kobe.

Club statistics

References

External links 

 
Profile at Vissel Kobe

1995 births
Living people
Association football people from Kanagawa Prefecture
Japanese footballers
J1 League players
J2 League players
J3 League players
Montedio Yamagata players
J.League U-22 Selection players
Urawa Red Diamonds players
Vissel Kobe players
Association football midfielders